The Central Road Board was the first dedicated body for administering the construction of roads and bridges in Victoria, Australia. It came into being in 1853 when the Victorian Legislative Council passed An Act for making, and improving Roads in the Colony of Victoria, known as the Roads Act.

Formation

Responsibility for the construction of roads and bridges in Victoria was initially held by the Clerk of Works. In 1844 a Superintendent of Bridges was appointed, who shared responsibility with the Colonial Engineer from 1852. From separation in 1851, these colonial officials were responsible to the Colonial Secretary. The first Victorian Governor, Charles Joseph La Trobe set up the Central Road Board as part of the establishment of self-governing bodies following the separation of Victoria from New South Wales. Peter Paul Labertouche was the Board's first secretary. the Board undertook some of the first major road improvements including construction of the Mount Alexander Road and St Kilda Road.

Responsibilities

The purposed of the Central Road Board was to fund improvements to roads and bridges and manage elections for District Road Boards. It replaced the previous county and parish trusts that existed between 1840 and 1842; the Act also established road districts The legislation was repealed in 1863. District Road Boards ultimately evolved into shire councils from 1869.

The Board was given authority to raise tolls, and a number of toll houses were set up under its control. It was modelled to some extent on similar authorities established in other colonies such as Alaska, Canada, South Africa, and Central Africa. Among the board's various members included military engineer Charles Pasley (1824-1890).

Abolition

With the abolition of the Central Road Board in 1863, the Board of Land and Works took over responsibility for main roads, while the District Road Boards were entrusted with local roads. A dedicated roads agency was not formed again in Victoria until the creation of the Country Roads Board in 1913.

See also 

 VicRoads
 Country Roads Board

References

Further reading
 
 Lay, Maxwell, Melbourne miles: the story of Melbourne's roads, Australian Scholarly Publishing, Melbourne, 2003

Transport in Victoria (Australia)
Former government agencies of Victoria (Australia)
Government agencies established in 1853
Government agencies disestablished in 1863
1853 establishments in Australia
1863 disestablishments in Australia